Pan Wei-ta (born 24 March 1956) is a Taiwanese lawyer.

Pan was educated at University of Nebraska College of Law and Tulane University. He has served on the board of directors of several Taiwanese companies, including Quanta Computer, China Life Insurance Company, and Aerospace Industrial Development Corporation, among others. Pan teaches law at Soochow University, and succeeded Huang Chen-tai as university president in 2012. His younger sister Tina Pan is a former Kuomintang legislator.

References

1956 births
Living people
20th-century Taiwanese lawyers
Academic staff of Soochow University (Taiwan)
University of Nebraska–Lincoln alumni
Tulane University alumni
Taiwanese legal scholars
21st-century Taiwanese lawyers